Jesús Rivas may refer to:
 Jesús Rivas (equestrian)
 Jesús Rivas (footballer)